The 1977–78 Scottish Premier Division season was won by Rangers, two points ahead of Aberdeen. Ayr United and Clydebank were relegated.

Table

Results

Matches 1–18
During matches 1–18 each team plays every other team twice (home and away).

Matches 19–36

References
1977–78 Scottish Premier Division – Statto

Scottish Premier Division seasons
1977–78 Scottish Football League
Scot